Luna is a village in Rajasthan, India, famous as the birthplace of Mehdi Hassan. It is a panchayat village in Al sisarTehseel of Jhunjhunu District.

Luna village might be the reference town for the famous motorette 'Luna' which was manufactured by Kinetic Industries of Uttar Pradesh in the late 1980s.

Demographics
In the India census of 2001, the village of Luna had a population of 1,620. Males constituted 54.7% (886) of the population and females 45.3% (734), for a gender ratio of 828 females per thousand males.

Notes

Villages in Jodhpur district